The 2010–11 season was Middlesbrough second consecutive season in the Championship. The club captain is Matthew Bates, with Tony Mowbray as manager. Mark Venus was appointed assistant manager. Former manager Gordon Strachan resigned on 18 October 2010 by mutual consent, following a string of poor results. Mowbray was appointed on 26 October 2010.

Season review

Championship

League table

Results summary

Result round by round

Championship results

Note: Results are given with Middlesbrough score listed first. Man of the Match is according to mfc.co.uk.

League Cup results

FA Cup results

Squad
The squad numbers for 2010–11 were announced on 2 August 2010.

 (captain)

 (on loan to Nottingham Forest)

 (on loan from Stoke City)
 (on loan from Nottingham Forest)

 (on loan to Scunthorpe United) 
 (vice-captain)

 

 

 (on loan from Hamburg)

Statistics

|}
(*: player has since left club)

Transfers

In

Out

Loan in

Loan out

References

2010-11
2010–11 Football League Championship by team